This is a list of people from Ellis County, Kansas, United States.  Inclusion on the list should be reserved for notable people past and present who have resided in the county, either in cities or rural areas.

Academics
 Maurice L. Albertson, former head of the Colorado State University Research Foundation
 Petrowitsch Bissing, violin instructor
 Nola Ochs, world's oldest college graduate, from Fort Hays State University

Arts and entertainment
 Rob Beckley, musician
 Robert Bogue, actor
 Rebecca Staab, actress
 Michael Wittig, member of the Dove Award-winning and Grammy-nominated Christian hard rock band Pillar

Athletics
See also List of Fort Hays State Tigers head football coaches
 Greg Anderson, personal trainer of Barry Bonds
 Monty Basgall, coach for the Los Angeles Dodgers
 Ken Crandall, head football coach for the Southwestern Moundbuilders
 Steve Crosby, National Football League player and coach
 Elon Hogsett, professional baseball player
 Tony Leiker, NFL defensive end 
 Tom Matukewicz, head football coach of the Northern Illinois Huskies
 Tim McCarty, college football coach
 Les Miller, National Football League player
 Frankie Neal, player for the Green Bay Packers
 Willard Schmidt, professional baseball player

Business
 Philip Anschutz, business magnate
 Walter Chrysler, founder of the Chrysler Corporation

Crime
 Robert Courtney, pharmacist convicted for pharmaceutical fraud

Folklore
 Elizabeth Polly, the so-called "Blue Light Lady"

Journalism
 John L. Allen Jr., journalist
 Melissa McDermott, news anchor

Politics
 Jeff Colyer, Lieutenant Governor of Kansas
 Sheila Frahm, United States Senator
 Kathryn O'Loughlin McCarthy, U.S. Representative from Kansas
 Jerry Moran, U.S. Senator from Kansas
 Andrew Frank Schoeppel, 29th Governor of Kansas
 Frances Tilton Weaver, feminist legal pioneer

Religion
 Virgil C. Dechant, twelfth Supreme Knight of the Knights of Columbus
 Firmin Martin Schmidt, Roman Catholic bishop

See also

 List of Fort Hays State University people
 Lists of people from Kansas

References

Ellis County